BXP may refer to:

 Boston Properties, a large American real estate company 
 Milkor BXP, a South African submachine gun
 Beximco Pharma, a pharmaceutical company in Bangladesh
 Bebil language of Cameroon
 Biała Podlaska Airport, eastern Poland
 Beijing West railway station
 Brexit Party, a UK political party